Xueren (English: The Scholar) was an influential Chinese independent intellectual journal that ran from 1991 to 2000. It was founded and edited by Chen Pingyuan, Wang Hui, and Wang Shouchang under the sponsorship of a Japanese foundation. In order to work around censorship conditions in the Chinese publishing industry that make it more difficult for periodicals to get approval than books, Xueren was published as a "series" in the latter format. Other journals that have taken the same approach include Res Publica and Horizons.

Scholar Chaohua Wang locates Xueren'''s origins in "the self-examination of intellectuals intimately involved in the ferment of the eighties":

The project of its editors [. . .] was to retrieve the history of modern Chinese scholarship (xueshu shi), a tradition they felt was in danger of being obscured or forgotten under the pressure of imported theories. In doing so, they wanted to clarify their own intellectual identity and responsibilities. What was their position in a historical chain of scholarly development? When and how should a scholar speak out on public issues?

Co-founder Wang Hui characterizes his and his colleagues' motivations similarly, but without a critical approach toward "imported theories" in academe as a primary component of their intellectual project, and with more of an eye toward directly socially relevant goals. According to him, Xueren was created to facilitate an effort by young intellectuals to "reconsider" modern Chinese history in the wake of the failure of the 1989 democracy movement, a "process of reflection" that

included serious reconsideration of modern history, conscientious rethinking of attempts to carry out radical reform on the basis of Western models, close investigation of the Chinese historical legacy and its contemporary significance, and necessary critiques of certain of the consequences of radical political action.

However, Wang Hui states that Xueren "did not pursue any particular academic agenda."

 Example table of contents 
The 648-page seventh issue of Xueren (May 1995) printed the following table of contents in English (though all articles were in Chinese):

 See also 
 Dushu, a journal of which Wang Hui would become editor in 1996, and which had been in the mid-to-late eighties a key popularizer of the "imported theories" to which Xueren'''s founding was in part a reaction

Notes

1991 establishments in China
2000 disestablishments in China
Chinese intellectual publications
Chinese-language magazines
Contemporary philosophical literature
Defunct magazines published in China
Magazines established in 1991
Magazines disestablished in 2000
Philosophy magazines